Bowdleria is now considered a former genus once identifying the two species of fernbird. Most taxonomists consider them to now be placed in the genus Megalurus: 
 New Zealand fernbird, Bowdleria punctata
 Chatham fernbird, Bowdleria rufescens